The Usambara shrew (Crocidura usambarae) is a species of mammal in the family Soricidae. It is endemic to Bumbuli District of Tanga Region in Tanzania.  Its natural habitat is subtropical or tropical moist montane forests of Usambara mountains.

References

Mammals of Tanzania
Endemic fauna of Tanzania
Crocidura
Mammals described in 1980
Taxonomy articles created by Polbot